Sir David Cunningham Carter  (born 3 April 1952) is a New Zealand National Party politician who served as the 29th Speaker of the New Zealand House of Representatives from 2013 to 2017 and as a Cabinet Minister in the Fourth and Fifth National Governments. He represented the Selwyn electorate in the 44th Parliament and the Banks Peninsula electorate in the 45th Parliament. He  served as a list MP from 1999 until he retired at the 2020 election.

Early life
Carter was born in Christchurch in 1952, the son of Merle and Maurice Carter. He attended St Bede's College, and has a Bachelor of Agricultural Science degree from Lincoln University. He has farmed sheep and cattle for over 30 years, and established the first commercial cattle-embryo transplant company in New Zealand in 1974.

Member of Parliament

Carter was first elected to Parliament in the 1994 by-election in Selwyn, replacing the resigning Ruth Richardson. In the 1996 general election he won the Banks Peninsula electorate against Dyson. In the 1999 election he was defeated by Dyson, but entered Parliament as a list MP. In the 2002 election, he failed to recapture the seat and remained a list MP.

From 1998 until the National Party's defeat in 1999 Carter was Minister for Senior Citizens, Associate Minister of Revenue, and Associate Minister for Food, Fibre, Biosecurity and Border Control. At the very end of National's term in office, he was also Associate Minister of Education.

In 2008, Carter was initially chosen as the National candidate for the resurrected safe National seat of Selwyn, but opposition to this saw the National candidacy up for grabs again. He pulled out and the candidacy was eventually won by Amy Adams, who won the seat. Carter was given a high list placing of nine instead and did not contest an electorate. After National's election victory, he took the portfolios of Agriculture, Biosecurity and Forestry.

Minister of Agriculture
In May 2010, Carter issued a ban on kosher slaughter, rejecting the recommendations of his advisers. Carter held shares in a firm that exports meat, and prior to instituting the ban he met senior managers of the firm who wanted a ban on kosher slaughter to reduce their competition.

Minister of Primary Industries
After the 2011 election, Carter was appointed Minister of the new Ministry of Primary Industries. In November 2012 he approved the increased squid fishery SQU6T by 140%, despite recommendations from scientists and the Department of Conservation that this would be detrimental to the endangered New Zealand sealion.

Speaker of the House
On 22 January 2013, the Prime Minister John Key announced that Carter was his preference to replace Lockwood Smith as Speaker of the House. Carter's appointment was not without controversy, and the Labour Party questioned whether he actually wanted the job.

As the opposition was not consulted as per convention, Trevor Mallard was nominated by Labour and the position was put to a vote on 31 January 2013. Carter won by 62 votes to 52. Consistent with the tradition of newly elected speakers, Carter had to be "dragged to the chair" following the election.

The office of speaker entitles Carter to the title The Right Honourable following a reform of the New Zealand royal honours system in 2010.

Carter cited his intention to continue as Speaker, "if that is the will of Parliament", as the basis for his decision to stand as a list-only candidate in the 2014 general election.

On 10 November 2015, Carter controversially failed to acknowledge offence caused to significant numbers of Labour and Green MPs after John Key had accused them of "backing rapists" during a debate about the Christmas Island Detention Centre. The following day, Carter silenced seven female MPs who stated that they were victims of sexual abuse and stood up to express personal offence to Key's statement, which they called on Key to apologise for. Carter ruled that the manner in which they stood to address the house was contrary to the House's standing orders and dismissed several of the seven; the remainder walked out.

On 11 May 2016, Carter dismissed the Prime Minister, John Key, from the debating chamber. Key had ignored several of the Speaker's warnings about behaviour contrary to the standing orders. Carter stated, "He is to be treated no differently to any other in this house".

In opposition, 2017–2020
Carter was returned as an MP through the National Party list in the 2017 election. Following the election, a Labour-led coalition government was formed with the support of the New Zealand First and Green parties.  Carter was succeeded as Speaker by Labour MP Trevor Mallard, who assumed the position on 7 November 2017.

In mid-October 2018, Carter confirmed that he along with fellow National MP Chris Finlayson would retire before the next general election. Carter denied that his resignation came as a result of a secret tape by National Party leader Simon Bridges suggesting that Finlayson should resign in order to clear the way for newer National MPs.

In late July 2020, Carter submitted a private member's bill seeking to repeal the Labour-led government's Electoral (Integrity) Amendment Act 2018. The bill passed its first reading and was referred to the justice select committee. Following the bill's first reading, Carter indicated that he would retire at the 2020 New Zealand general election. Carter's private member bill was assigned to fellow National MP Nick Smith.

In the 2021 New Year Honours, Carter was appointed a Knight Companion of the New Zealand Order of Merit, for services as a Member of Parliament and Speaker of the House of Representatives.

Post-parliament
Following his retirement from parliament, Carter was elected to the National Party's Board of Directors on 21 November 2020. He challenged Peter Goodfellow for the role of President but was unsuccessful. On 8 August 2021 he resigned from the board after another unsuccessful challenge to Goodfellow. He stated that he has "zero confidence" in Goodfellow, criticising the alleged "dysfunctional governance" of the party and lack of money to run a suitable campaign.

References

External links

David Carter MP official site
Profile at National Party

|-

|-

|-

|-

|-

|-

|-

|-

1952 births
Lincoln University (New Zealand) alumni
Living people
Knights Companion of the New Zealand Order of Merit
New Zealand list MPs
New Zealand National Party MPs
People educated at St Bede's College, Christchurch
Speakers of the New Zealand House of Representatives
Unsuccessful candidates in the 1993 New Zealand general election
Members of the New Zealand House of Representatives
New Zealand MPs for South Island electorates
21st-century New Zealand politicians
Candidates in the 2017 New Zealand general election
New Zealand politicians awarded knighthoods